FlipKey is an online vacation rental marketplace. It is a subsidiary of TripAdvisor. In 2016 the company listed more than 300,000 properties in 179 countries. Its headquarters is in Boston, Massachusetts, United States.

Although rental owners are verified by the company's staff before being added to the FlipKey website, the site relies heavily on traveler reviews of rental properties. FlipKey also publishes ratings for travel-related items such as food blogs and in the United States it provides ratings of national historic sites.

Citing complaints that FlipKey would not guarantee functional amenities in its rental sites, in 2016 Better Business Bureau gave the company an F rating.

History
FlipKey was founded in 2007 as a house-swapping and vacation rental listing website. The company was acquired by travel website, TripAdvisor, in 2008. That year FlipKey was included in Travel and Leisure's list of top travel websites.

At first Flipkey sold subscriptions to homeowners, operating from  offices on Lincoln Street in Boston. After 2013, FlipKey changed its sales model, giving property owners the option of paying a percentage commission for each property rented. 

In 2014, FlipKey moved its offices to Causeway Street in Boston, which was also expected to house another Tripadvisor subsidiary, Smarter Travel.  That year Flipkey created a virtual tour of Boston for its website, to promote its property listings there.

In 2015, FlipKey updated its technology platform, resulting in complaints from some large property managers that they were being overcharged. In 2017, the city of Coral Gables, Florida, sued FlipKey, claiming that the company had ignored city statutes prohibiting commercial activity in residential areas.

References

External links 
 www.flipkey.com

Tripadvisor
American companies established in 2007
Hospitality companies established in 2007
Real estate companies established in 2007
Internet properties established in 2007
Hospitality companies of the United States
Online marketplaces of the United States
Vacation rental
Companies based in Boston